A list of films produced by the Bollywood film industry based in Mumbai in 1936:

A

B

C-D

E-H

J-L

M-N

O-R

S-Z

References

External links
asc&title_type=feature&year=1936 Bollywood films of 1936 at IMDb

1936
Bollywood
Films, Bollywood
Articles containing video clips